Houlding is a surname. Notable people with the surname include:

Deborah Houlding (born 1962), English astrologer
Chris Houlding, English trombonist
John Houlding, (1833–1902) English businessman, Lord Mayor of Liverpool, founder of Liverpool Football Club
Leo Houlding (born 1980), British rock climber